Dzików, is a borough, one of the oldest parts of Tarnobrzeg, Poland. It is a cultural and historical center of the town. Dzików is famous as a private property of Tarnowski family. Tarnowski built here Castle. Dzików is also known as a place where Dzików Confederation were formed.

Several important events took place here, such as the 1734 Dzików Confederation, and the 1927 Conservative Party Congress. Currently, Dzików is popular among residents of the town because of the picturesque 19th century park, which surrounds the castle. In the early 1990s, in Wymyslowo, north of the palace and park, a new district of blocks of flats was built.

The Dzikow Castle itself was built in the mid-14th century, during the reign of King Kazimierz Wielki. It had a stone tower, and its purpose was to guard the Vistula river waterway. In the 15th century, it fell into a ruin, and its renovation did not begin until the early 17th century. Dzikow Castle was home to Our Lady of Dzikow, and local people believed that during the Swedish invasion, their prayers were heard by the Lady. This came to Church officials, and on November 11, 1675 in Kielce, Bishop of Kraków Andrzej Trzebicki recognized the painting as miraculous. This decision led to the invitation of Dominican friars, whose task was to protect the painting. Owners of Dzikow, Jan Tarnowski and his wife Zofia Barbara née Firley, founded a monastery, to which the painting was moved on May 20, 1678. The construction of the monastery itself was not completed until 1782.

Dzików, spelled דזשיקעוו (Dzhikev) or דזיקוב (Dzhikov) in Yiddish and Hebrew respectively, is also the traditional Jewish name of Tarnobrzeg.

See also
Jan Słomka (1842–1932), mayor

References 

Districts of Tarnobrzeg